Lucas Gabriel Da Silva Teodoro (born 24 May 2002), known as just Lucão, is a Brazilian footballer who plays for North Texas SC on loan from Alverca.

Career
Lucão played as part of the youth team at Ituano, before moving to Alverca in Portugal.

On 5 August 2021, Lucão joined USL League One side North Texas SC on loan for the remainder of 2021 and the 2022 season. He made his debut on 11 September 2021, appearing as a 79th-minute substitute during a 2–0 loss to South Georgia Tormenta.

References

2002 births
Living people
Brazilian footballers
Association football defenders
F.C. Alverca players
North Texas SC players
USL League One players
Expatriate footballers in Portugal
Expatriate soccer players in the United States
Brazilian expatriate sportspeople in Portugal
Brazilian expatriate sportspeople in the United States
Brazilian expatriate footballers